The Cambuurstadion is a football stadium in the east side of the city of Leeuwarden, Netherlands. It is used for the home matches of SC Cambuur. The stadium is able to hold 10,500 people and it opened on 12 September 1936. The club has proposed plans for a new stadium on the west side of the city, which will cost €35 million.

References

Football venues in the Netherlands
Sports venues in Friesland
Sports venues completed in 1936
Sport in Leeuwarden
Buildings and structures in Leeuwarden
SC Cambuur